A Royal Family is a 1915 American silent drama film directed by William Nigh and starring Fuller Mellish, Montagu Love and Anna Murdock. It is also sometimes alternatively titled The Royal Family.

Cast
 Fuller Mellish as Cardinal
 Montagu Love as Crown Prince of Kurland
 Anna Murdock as Angela - Princess of Arcacia 
 William Nigh as Minister of Police
 Lila Barclay		
 Mathilde Brundage		
 W. J. Draper		
 Edwin Mordant
 Niles Welch		
 Albert Lewis		
 Jules Cowles
 Charles Prince

References

Bibliography
James Robert Parish & Michael R. Pitts. Film directors: a guide to their American films. Scarecrow Press, 1974.

External links
 

1915 films
1915 drama films
1910s English-language films
American silent feature films
Silent American drama films
American black-and-white films
Films directed by William Nigh
Metro Pictures films
1910s American films